Bekbele is a town in İskenderun district of Hatay Province, Turkey. It is almost merged to İskenderun. The population of Bekbele was 7,548  as of 2012.The settlement was founded in by a tribe named Abacılı from Dulkadir territory (present Kahramanmaraş Province) of the Ottoman Empire towards the end of the 18th century. According to mayor's page, Abacılı which refers to manufacturing coarse woolen cloth was a subtribe of Bayat, a Turkmen tribe.

References 

Towns in Turkey
Populated places in Hatay Province
İskenderun District